Calenia lueckingii is a species of foliicolous (leaf-dwelling) lichen in the family Gomphillaceae. It was formally described as a new species in 1996 by Claudia Hartmann. The type specimen was collected by the author from the edge of Braulio Carrillo National Park (Heredia Province) in Costa Rica; there it was found growing on the leaves of Ardisia in a tropical wet transition rainforest. The species epithet honours German lichenologist Robert Lücking. In 2018, the lichen was recorded from Hainan, China.

References

Ostropales
Lichen species
Lichens described in 1996
Lichens of Central America
Lichens of China